Ibedul is a title given to the high chief of Koror, in Palau.

It has been given to:

 Ibedul Abba Thulle, father of Prince Lee Boo
 Ibedul Gibbons (1944–2021), high chief and activist, Ibedul from 1973 to his death

References 

Noble titles
Politics of Palau